The UC Davis Aggies college football team represented University of California, Davis. The Aggies currently compete in the Big Sky Conference of the NCAA Division I Football Championship Subdivision. The Aggies conference affiliations have been:
 1915–1924: Independent
 1925–1992: Northern California Athletic Conference
 1993: American West Conference
 1994–2003: NCAA Division II Independent
 2004–2011: Great West Football Conference
 2012–present: Big Sky Conference

Through the 2019 season, the program has had 17  identifiable head coaches since 1915, including three who have had multiple tenures.

Coaches 

Note: From 1977 on, Bowl Game count includes post-season Division II playoff appearances

References

UC Davis Aggies

UC Davis Aggies football